David Leeming (1876 – January 2, 1939) was an English-born politician in British Columbia, Canada. He served as mayor of Victoria from 1931 to 1936.

He was born in Manchester and moved to Victoria in 1894. He worked as a real estate agent and customs broker. In 1908, he married Amy Theresa McKenzie. Leeming served on Victoria city council from 1922 to 1923. He was a director of the Victoria and Island Publicity Bureau, also serving as president, and was a member of the Victoria Chamber of Commerce. Leeming also served as president of the Victoria Real Estate Board.

He died in Victoria at the age of 62.

References 

Mayors of Victoria, British Columbia
1876 births
1939 deaths
Politicians from Manchester
Customs brokers
British emigrants to Canada